Crex Meadows is a wildlife area that consists of marshes, wetlands, brush prairies, and forests. Crex Meadows is located in near the village of Grantsburg, Wisconsin, in Burnett County, Wisconsin. Its  are home to 270 species of birds and 600 species of plants.

Geological History
Crex Meadows is included in the Northwest Wisconsin pine barrens. These “barrens” are a large, sandy plain that was left as the glacier withdrew from the area around 13,000 years ago. Crex is located in the southern area of the barrens and contains huge marshes. The Crex Meadows were the result of the glacier that created the early Glacial Lake Grantsburg.

Inhabited History
The Horicon Marsh area has been inhabited by people, including the Fox, Dakota, and Chippewa Indians who used the region mainly for hunting and gathering. During the 17th century, many Indians battles are thought to have occurred in the area. The Chippewa Indians were the rulers of the land when Europeans first arrived in the area during the 18th century.

Starting in the 19th century, the Euro-Americans tried farming the sandy soil, but gave up defeated The lack of wildfires in the area nearly eliminated the brush prairie. A large drainage project in the 1890s resulted in less nesting and migrating to the area by wetland birds and animals.

In 1912, the Crex Carpet Company bought  of today’s Crex Meadows. The company produced grass rugs and created carpet camps in the area. The grass rug business was successful until linoleum floor covering was invented and became popular in homes. Thus, in 1933 the Crex Carpet Company went bankrupt, yet the name of “Crex” lives on.

In 1946, the state of Wisconsin bought  of the now tax delinquent land in order to start the Crex Meadows Wildlife Area.

Wildlife
The National Bird Conservancy categorizes Crex Meadows as one of the top 500 Globally Important Bird Areas in the United States of America. Crex Meadows has a wide variety of bird species and is home to nearly every mammal found in Wisconsin as well as other marsh dwelling species.

Ospreys, eagles, trumpeter swans, Karner blue butterflies, Blandings turtles, and red-necked grebes are some of the endangered and threatened animals that find shelter in Crex Meadows. A specific pack of Timber wolves, nicknamed "the Crex pack," have been breeding and living on the property since 1995. Additionally, the peregrine falcon, Caspian tern, and great egret seasonally make their home at Crex.

References

External links
Crex Meadows Wildlife Area—Wisconsin Department of Natural Resources
Crex Meadows State Wildlife Area–Friends of Crex

Protected areas of Burnett County, Wisconsin
State Wildlife Areas of Wisconsin
1946 establishments in Wisconsin
Protected areas established in 1946